Jean-Claude Merceron (born 12 January 1942 in Givrand, Vendée) is a former member of the Senate of France, who represented the Vendée department.  He is a member of the Centrist Alliance and caucuses with the Centrist Union.

References
Page on the Senate website

1942 births
Living people
People from Vendée
Union for French Democracy politicians
Democratic Movement (France) politicians
Centrist Alliance politicians
French Senators of the Fifth Republic
Senators of Vendée